Frank Bruno vs. Mike Tyson II, billed as The Championship: Part I, was a professional boxing match contested on March 16, 1996 for the WBC heavyweight championship.

Background
Frank Bruno, at that time, had been a professional boxer for over thirteen years. He was a former European heavyweight champion and had received several shots at the world heavyweight title over the course of his career. The first came in 1986, when he was knocked out by Tim Witherspoon in a bout for his WBA title. He fought Mike Tyson in 1989 for his undisputed world championship but was knocked out in the fifth round. After fighting Lennox Lewis for his WBC title in Cardiff Arms Park in 1993 and losing, Bruno would have to wait two years for another title shot. He fought Oliver McCall, who defeated Lewis in an upset in 1994 for the WBC title, on September 2, 1995, in London. McCall had claimed he was going to get revenge on the English through Bruno after Gerald McClellan suffered permanent brain damage in a title fight against Nigel Benn in February that year, but Bruno outboxed McCall to win his first world championship.

Tyson was released from prison on parole in 1995 after he was convicted of raping Desiree Washington in 1991. He had fought two fights since his release, beating Peter McNeeley by disqualification in his pay-per-view return and knocking out Buster Mathis, Jr. in a nationally televised bout on Fox. After the victory against Mathis, Tyson was placed ahead of Lewis in the line of contenders for the WBC title and his promoter Don King, who also promoted Oliver McCall, drew up a contract where McCall would defend his title against Bruno and the winner of the fight would be forced to defend the belt against Tyson in their first defense.

The fight
Mike Tyson was the aggressor for the entire fight. In round 1, Tyson continuously attacked Bruno with right overhand punches, forcing Bruno to grapple with Tyson several times in the round in order to weather the storm. In the final 30 seconds of the round, the two men would go toe-to-toe with Tyson connecting with a power right hand that staggered Bruno. Bruno would regain his composure and exchange punches with Tyson until the bell sounded. During their first round exchange, Bruno would receive a cut over his left eye. Tyson would continue to attack Bruno in round 2, with Bruno again grappling with Tyson at a frequent basis in an effort to slow Tyson down. Less than a minute into the third round, Tyson dodged a Bruno jab and proceeded to unleash a 13-punch combination that caused referee Mills Lane to stop the fight and award Tyson the victory via technical knockout.

Aftermath
The match would prove to be the final one of Frank Bruno's career. Though he initially talked about a potential third fight with Tyson, he was advised by doctors that he risked losing vision in one eye if he continued to fight and subsequently announced his retirement from the ring shortly thereafter.

Mike Tyson would next set his sights on the WBA Heavyweight champion Bruce Seldon. However, Tyson's contract stated that he would first have to defend the WBC Heavyweight title against number one contender Lennox Lewis. Don King eventually paid Lewis $4 million to step aside and let Tyson face Seldon on the condition that Lewis would get his WBC title shot after. Tyson would then go on to defeat Seldon by 1st round knockout to capture the WBA Heavyweight title.

Undercard
Confirmed bouts:
Christy Martin WUD6 Deirdre Gogarty

Broadcasting

References

World Boxing Council heavyweight championship matches
1996 in boxing
Boxing in Las Vegas
Boxing on Showtime
1996 in sports in Nevada
Boxing matches involving Mike Tyson
March 1996 sports events in the United States
MGM Grand Garden Arena